"Distant Drums" is a song which provided US singer Jim Reeves with his only UK No. 1 hit – albeit posthumously – in the United Kingdom in 1966, some two years after his death in a plane crash on 31 July 1964. The song remained in the UK Singles Chart for 25 weeks.  The single also topped the US country chart for four weeks, becoming his most successful posthumous single.

Legacy
Although Roy Orbison had recorded the song in 1963, it is Reeves' version of "Distant Drums" which has endured over the years.

During its time at the top of the UK chart, the song beat off stiff competition from several major (and living) artists of the day. These included The Beatles - who had entered the UK chart around the same time with their double A-sided release "Eleanor Rigby"/"Yellow Submarine" - and the Small Faces, who had also charted in the UK with "All or Nothing".

It was an unexpected achievement for a song that Reeves had recorded for its composer, Cindy Walker, under the impression it was for her private use only and had earlier been dismissed by both the RCA record company and Chet Atkins (a noted guitarist and record producer who worked with Reeves) as unsuitable for wider public release.

Following Reeves' death, the track was overdubbed with an orchestral backing and released to the public as the version that later climbed up the music charts in both the United States and the UK.

"Distant Drums" first entered the UK Singles Chart during the summer of 1966, before reaching the No. 1 position on 22 September, where it remained for five weeks.

It was named the UK's "song of the year" and Reeves became the first overseas performer to receive this special award.

"Distant Drums" remained at No. 1 on the UK Singles Chart for a total of five weeks. Only Tom Jones with his recording of "Green, Green Grass of Home" had a longer tenure as the UK's top hit single record of 1966, with seven weeks at No. 1, although three of those weeks were in early 1967.

Chart performance

Roy Orbison

Jim Reeves

Vic Dana

See also
List of posthumous number-one singles (UK)

References

External links
UK Official Chart website

Songs about drums
1963 songs
1966 singles
Roy Orbison songs
Jim Reeves songs
Monument Records singles
Song recordings produced by Fred Foster
Songs released posthumously
UK Singles Chart number-one singles
Songs written by Cindy Walker
Song recordings produced by Chet Atkins
RCA Records singles